Burnsius philetas, the desert checkered-skipper, formerly known as Pyrgus philetas, is a species of skipper butterfly in the family Hesperiidae. Strays are found north to northern Arizona and northern Texas.

The wingspan is 25–29 mm. There are two to three generations, from February to December in Texas and from April to October in Arizona.

The larvae feed on several plants in the  family Malvaceae, including Malvastrum and Sida. Adults feed on flower nectar.

External links
Butterflies and Moths of North America

Pyrgus
Butterflies described in 1881